Silver Spur (also written as Silverspur) is a rural town and locality in the Goondiwindi Region, Queensland, Australia. It is on the border of Queensland and New South Wales.

History 
Silverspur Provisional School opened on 27 May 1895. On 1 November 1912 it became Silverspur State School. It closed on 1960. It was on the Stanthorpe – Texas Road on the corner of Hilton Street.

St Mary Magdalene's Anglican Church was dedicated on 19 August 1932 by the Archbishop of Brisbane Gerald Sharp. It was on the Stanthorpe Texas Road. It closed circa 1966. 

Facilities 
There is a cemetery at the end of Spooners Road off Waverley Lane operated by the Goondiwindi Regional Council.

References

External links 
 

Towns in Queensland
Goondiwindi Region
Localities in Queensland